Allocasuarina filidens, commonly known as the Mount Beerwah sheoak, is a shrub of the genus Allocasuarina native to Queensland.

Often found growing amongst other shrubs in the crevices of trachyte rocks, it has a limited range that is restricted to the Glass House Mountains in eastern Queensland on the summits and exposed upper slopes.

The species was first described in 1989 by the botanist Lawrence Alexander Sidney Johnson as part of the work Casuarinaceae. Flora of Australia .

References

filidens
Flora of Queensland
Fagales of Australia
Plants described in 1989
Dioecious plants